2nd Corps or Hương Giang Corps (literally: Corps of the Perfume River) is one of the four regular army corps of the Vietnam People's Army. First organised in 1974 during the Vietnam War, 2nd Corps had a major role in the Ho Chi Minh Campaign that ended the war. Today the corps is stationed in Lạng Giang District, Bắc Giang.

 Commander: Maj. Gen. Phạm Văn Hưng
 Political Commissar: Maj. Gen. Trần Võ Dũng

History
In July 1973, the Central Committee of the Communist Party of Vietnam after its 21st conference issued a resolution of strengthening the armed forces to unify the country. In executing the issue, three months later the Ministry of Defence and the Military Commission of the Central Committee approved the plan of organising regular army corps for the Vietnam People's Army. On 17 May 1974, General Võ Nguyên Giáp, Minister of Defence, signed the edict that led to the establishment of the 2nd Corps in Thừa Thiên, now Thừa Thiên–Huế Province, where is located the Perfume River (Sông Hương or Hương Giang), that came the name Hương Giang Corps of the unit.  The first headquarters of the corps consisted of political commissar (chính ủy) Lê Linh and commander (tư lệnh) Hoàng Văn Thái.

In early 1975, 2nd Corps was a major force of the Vietnam People's Army in Hue-Da Nang and Tây Nguyên Campaign. During the Ho Chi Minh Campaign, it was 2nd Corps that first advanced in the city of Saigon and captured the Independence Palace, which was the workplace of the president Duong Van Minh of South Vietnam. Colonel Bùi Quang Thận, then a Captain in the 2nd Corps, was the person who raised the flag of Liberation Army in the roof of the Independence Palace and marked the end of the Vietnam War. After the war, 2nd Corps continued to engage in Laos (1976–1979) and Cambodian–Vietnamese War (1978–1979). The corps was awarded the title Hero of the People's Armed Forces (Anh hùng Lực lượng vũ trang nhân dân) in 1985.

Organisation

The command structure of 2nd Corps consists of the High Command (Bộ tư lệnh), the Staff of 2nd Corps (Bộ tham mưu), the Political Department (Cục chính trị), the Department of Logistics (Cục hậu cần) and the Department of Technique (Cục kỹ thuật). The combat forces of the corps include:

Commanders

Notes

References
 

Corps of the People's Army of Vietnam
Military units and formations established in 1974
Hero of the People's Armed Forces